Pustakam or Pusthakam means Book in Telugu language.
 Prema Pustakam is a 1992 Telugu film. 
 Pelli Pustakam (1991 film), a Telugu-language romantic comedy film
 Pelli Pustakam (2013 film), an Indian Telugu-language film